Phillip J. Roth (born June 10, 1959) is an American film producer, director and screenwriter who is known for making low-budget films. He is the founder of the Unified Film Organization (UFO) in America and Bulgaria, which have released various action and science fiction films for television and home video markets.

Early life and career

Roth was born in Portland, Oregon to Phillip J. Roth, a Senior circuit judge from Multnomah County, Oregon and Ida Lorraine Roth Knudson. He attended high school in Portland, Oregon with musician Jim Goodwin, who has written the original music for several Roth films, including Digital Man and Velocity Trap.

He expressed an interest in cinema from an early age, upon seeing his first film that he wanted to "tell pictures with light" and he later achieved his dream. His first film Bad Trip, was made for television, which led to other hi-concept sci-fi films like A.P.E.X. and Total Reality. During his career he has worked with such stars as Tom Berenger, Martin Sheen, Judd Nelson, William Shatner, Billy Zane, Billy Baldwin, Michael Ironside, Cloris Leachman, and the late Academy Award-winner Cliff Robertson.

In 1995, Roth formed the Bulgarian United Film Organization (BUFO) in Sofia, Bulgaria with Ken Olandt. BUFO is a production services company for U.S companies including Universal Pictures. He formed the American Unified Film Organization in 1997 with Jeff Beach in Burbank, California. He recognized the growing demand in Science fiction and special effects driven action films.

In 2000, Roth moved from Los Angeles to Sofia, Bulgaria to shoot the film Mindstorm. Since then his companies UFO and BUFO have produced many films. Roth has also opened a new four stage film and television center in Bulgaria.

As of 2017, his net worth is $500,000.

Personal life
Roth met Leslie Crawford and they dated each other for 2 years from 1987 - 1989, they married in June 1989, soon afterwards they had a daughter called Natasha Mozelle Roth, after a 5 year relationship they divorced in March 1995.

He then met Lizzy Weintraub and they dated each other in 1994, they then married each other in May 1995, they had a son in 1998 called Aaron Henry Roth, after an 8 year relationship they divorced in January 2002.

In 2002, he met Ralitsa Roth and married her a year later, after a 5 year relationship they divorced in January 2008.

Roth met Ekaterina Jeliazkova in 2002. Their first daughter Elayah Roth was born in October 2006.  They married on September 1st, 2009. Their second daughter, Roxanne Roth was born in October 2011.

One of Roth's hobbies is skiing. He has taken part in races in the FIS Eastern European National Circuit, and he also won a prize at a corporate celebrity charity ski event in Bansko.

Filmography

As producer

As director

Accolades

References

External links
 
 
 United Film Organization America
 Unified Film Organization Bulgaria - About us
 Unified Film Organization LLC Films

1959 births
Living people
Businesspeople from Portland, Oregon
Filmmakers from Portland, Oregon
American film directors
American male screenwriters
Writers from Portland, Oregon
Screenwriters from Oregon
Film producers from Oregon